The Belciugatele is a right tributary of the river Mostiștea in Romania. It flows into the Mostiștea in Dârvari.

References

Rivers of Romania
Rivers of Călărași County
Rivers of Ilfov County